John Michell (by 1491 – 15 October 1546) was an English politician.

Family
He was the brother of the MP, Thomas Michell.

Career
He was a Member (MP) of the Parliament of England for New Shoreham in 1529.

References

15th-century births
1546 deaths
English MPs 1529–1536